Dinner time, Dinnertime, and the like, may refer to:

 Dinner Time (cartoon), a 1928 animated short
 "Dinner Time",  episode of Phil of the Future television series
 Dinnertime, a 1972 Alex Taylor album
 "Dinner-Time at Penshurst in 1655", a painting by Solomon Hart
 "Dinner Time", a song by Royce da 5'9" featuring Busta Rhymes from Street Hop
 Dinner Time (album), a 2007 album by Boot Camp Clik member Louieville Sluggah

See also
 Dinner
 Supper-time (disambiguation)